The 2019 UCLA Bruins football team represented the University of California, Los Angeles in the 2019 NCAA Division I FBS football season. The Bruins play their home games at the Rose Bowl in Pasadena, California. UCLA competed as a member of the South Division of the Pac-12 Conference. The team was led by second-year head coach Chip Kelly. The Bruins began the season 1–5 before winning three straight games. However, the Bruins then lost their final three games of the season. They finished the season 4–8 overall and 4–5 in Pac-12 play, tying Arizona State for third place in the Pac-12 South Division, and were outscored by their opponents by a combined total of 417 to 320. The Bruins' average attendance at home was 43,848, their lowest since 1982 when they moved to the Rose Bowl.

Previous season

The Bruins finished the 2018 season 3–9 overall, 3–6 in Pac-12 play to finish in fifth place in the South Division. Their 3–9 record was their worst record since 1971.

Offseason

Coaching changes

Outside linebackers and special teams coach Roy Manning left to become the cornerbacks coach at Oklahoma. He was replaced by Jason Kaufusi.

2019 NFL Draft

Bruins who were picked in the 2019 NFL Draft:

Preseason

Pac-12 media days

Pac-12 media poll
In the 2019 Pac-12 preseason media poll, UCLA was voted to finish in a tie for third with Arizona State in third place in the South Division.

Position key

Recruits
The Bruins signed a total of 15 recruits during the Early Signing Period.

Personnel

Coaching staff

Roster

Schedule

Sources:

Game summaries

at Cincinnati

San Diego State

Oklahoma

at Washington State

at Arizona

Oregon State

at Stanford

Dorian Thompson-Robinson returned from a leg injury the month before to throw for two touchdowns and run for another to lead UCLA to a 34–16 win over Stanford, ending their 11-game losing streak against the Cardinal. It was the Bruins longest against any opponent in their first 100 years of football. Joshua Kelley ran for 176 yards on 18 carries for the Bruins.  Their defense limited Stanford to a season-low 198 yards and totalled seven sacks, almost equalling their previous season total of nine.

Arizona State

Joshua Kelley ran 34 times for 164 yards and a career-high four touchdowns in a 42–32 upset over No. 24 Arizona State.

Colorado

The Bruins won 31–14 over Colorado for coach Chip Kelly's first three-game winning steak with the team. It was their fourth win of the season, exceeding their total from a year earlier. Thompson-Robinson returned from a knee injury the previous game to pass for 226 yards and two touchdowns, and added 38 yards rushing. Kelley rushed for 126 yards and two touchdowns. UCLA had 426 yards in total offense; they ran for over 200 yards for five consecutive games for the first time since 1978.

at Utah

The Bruins committed a season-high five turnovers in a 49–3 loss to No. 7 Utah. They fell behind 28–3 in the first half, when Thompson-Robinson committed two of his four turnovers. Three times in the half they were inside the Utes' 30-yard line, but managed just three points. They went scoreless in the final 51:55 of the game. Utes running back Zack Moss had 181 of his 200 all-purpose yards by halftime. For the contest, UCLA scored just once in four trips to the red zone, turning it over the other three times. They established a season low for points, and were held without a touchdown for the first time since a 50–0 loss to USC in 2011.

The Utes outgained the Bruins 536–269 in total yards. UCLA gained just 50 yards rushing against a defense that entered No. 1 in the nation against the run.  Kelley had 78 yards rushing on 4.1 yards per carry.

at USC

UCLA surrendered 643 total yards to No. 23 USC as the Bruins lost 52–35. Trojans quarterback Kedon Slovis set a USC school record with 515 passing yards, which was also the most in the rivalry's history. The Trojans established a school record with four receivers each catching for over 100 yards. The game began well for UCLA, who scored on their opening drive, like they had in their four previous wins on the season. They were up 7–3 late in the first quarter and driving on the USC 27 when Thompson-Robinson was intercepted. The Bruins were behind 24–14 at halftime. They drew to within 45–35 with 12:16 remaining in the game after scoring touchdowns on three straight possessions in the second half. 

Kelley was held to 45 yards rushing after gaining a rivalry-record 289 a year before against the Trojans. With the defense focused on the Bruins running back, Thompson-Robinson compiled 431 yards in total offense along with four touchdowns. He was 26-of-44 passing for 367 yards and three touchdowns with one interception, and ran for 64 yards and another touchdown. The loss pushed UCLA out of contention for a bowl game, and assured them of four straight losing seasons for the first time since 1924.

vs. California

UCLA lost 28–18 to California for their fourth straight losing season and second under coach Kelly. The Golden Bears, who entered with the worst offense in the Pac-12, were led by quarterback Chase Garbers's 230 yards passing and running back Christopher Brown Jr.'s 111 yards rushing and two touchdowns. UCLA lost their last three games, allowing an average of 43 points per game.

Kelley ran for 76 yards to become the eighth Bruin to run for 1,000 yards in consecutive seasons. The attendance of 38,102 gave UCLA an average home crowd of 43,848 for the season, its worst since moving to the Rose Bowl in 1982. Their previous low was 49,107 in 1995.

Statistics

Awards and honors
 September 23, 2019 –  Quarterback Dorian Thompson-Robinson was named Pac-12 Offensive Player of the Week, running back Demetric Felton was named the Pac-12 Special Teams Player of the Week, and wide receiver/returner Kyle Philips was named Pac-12 Freshman of the Week

Players drafted into the NFL

References

UCLA
UCLA Bruins football seasons
UCLA Bruins football